The Mobile Cup was a senior (over 50s) men's professional golf tournament played on the European Seniors Tour from 2002 to 2005. In 2002 and 2003 it was held at Stoke Park Golf Club, Stoke Poges, Buckinghamshire, in 2004 it was played at The Oxfordshire Golf Club, Thame, Oxfordshire, while in 2005 it was held at Collingtree Park Golf Club, Northampton. In 2002 Bernard Gallacher's victory was his only success on the European Seniors Tour. Carl Mason's win in 2003 was the first of his record 25 wins on the tour.

Winners

External links
Coverage on the European Senior Tour's official site (2005)
Coverage on the European Senior Tour's official site (2004)
Coverage on the European Senior Tour's official site (2003 and 2002)

Former European Senior Tour events
Golf tournaments in England
Recurring sporting events established in 2002
Recurring sporting events disestablished in 2005